RCAF Station Pearce, or RCAF Aerodrome Pearce or BCATP Station Pearce, was a Second World War training air station of the British Commonwealth Air Training Plan (BCATP). It was located northeast of Fort Macleod, Alberta, Canada.

History

World War II

The Pearce aerodrome was the home of three training schools: No. 36 Elementary Flying Training School (EFTS), a Royal Air Force school which operated from March to August 1942 (flying Tiger Moths and Stearmans); No. 3 Air Observer School (AOS) (using Ansons), which operated from September 1942 to June 1943; and No. 2 Flying Instructor School (FIS), which flew Cornells, Cranes, Fawns, Finchs, Harvards, Oxfords, Tiger Moths and Ansons. No. 2 FIS operated from May 1943 to January 1945, having moved from Vulcan.

Aerodrome information
Three runways were listed as follows:

Postwar
In 1945, after the end of the war in the Pacific, Avro Lancaster bombers which the RCAF intended to be used against Japan as part of the Tiger Force (air) were flown to Pearce for storage and dispersal. According to one source, 83 Lancasters arrived at the airfield on a single afternoon in September, with many of their pilots putting on an impromptu airshow before landing their aircraft for the last time.

The aerodrome is still visible today; however, all of the structures from the old station have been removed. A memorial cairn has been installed at the site of the original guard house to inform visitors of the station's history.

References

 BCATP Information from Bombercrew.com Retrieved April 4, 2011
 BCATP Pearce from bombercommandmuseum.ca Retrieved April 4, 2011
 Bruce Forsyth's Canadian Military History Page Retrieved April 4, 2011

Pearce
Pearce
Pearce
Military airbases in Alberta
Military history of Alberta
1940s establishments in Alberta
Military installations closed in the 1940s